Timothy Iredale (born 24 October 1972 in Huddersfield, West Riding of Yorkshire) is an English television journalist, currently the Political Editor for BBC Yorkshire and Lincolnshire.

Early life 
Iredale grew up in Huddersfield and attended Shelley High School on Huddersfield Road in Shelley, West Yorkshire.

Career 
Tim Iredale is the BBC Political Editor for Yorkshire and Lincolnshire (broadcast from Belmont). He covers the region which was home to some of the most familiar political heavyweights, including John Prescott (Baron Prescott), Alan Johnson and David Davis.

He worked in Exeter for a local newspaper.

ITV
Prior to moving to the BBC in 2006, Tim was the Chief Political Correspondent for ITV Yorkshire from 2001 (broadcast from Emley Moor and Belmont).

BBC
In September 2009 he became the main presenter for the region's Politics Show, broadcast Sundays on BBC1. This had been presented by Clare Frisby, and previous to her, Cathy Killick. He has also acted as a political reporter (known as a network correspondent) for Radio 4's news programmes. The Politics Show became Sunday Politics.

He is also a regular presenter of the Look North programme.

Personal life
He lives in Bradford. His Barnsley-born wife, Jennine (née Stanley), is a veterinary nurse in Batley.

See also
 Len Tingle, Political Editor for BBC Yorkshire (west, north and south, broadcast from Emley Moor)

External links 
 
 
 Former blog until 2015
 Tim Iredale's BBC profile
 The Politics Show
 Journalisted

News items
 Becoming the Politics Show presenter in 2009
 His wife has a car accident in April 2006

1972 births
Living people
BBC newsreaders and journalists
English political journalists
ITV regional newsreaders and journalists
People from Huddersfield
Television personalities from West Yorkshire